The City of Strangers is the second novel by Irish/English writer Michael Russell in The City series of crime novels set in Dublin, Ireland and  Danzig, Germany in the 1930s. It was published in 2013 by Avon. It was nominated for the Crime Writers' Association Endeavour Historical Dagger Award for best historical crime fiction of  2014.

References

2013 Irish novels
Crime novels
Avon (publisher) books
Novels set in Dublin (city)
Novels set in Germany